James Daniel Mangan (September 24, 1929 – July 19, 2007) was an American professional baseball player. He was born in San Francisco, attended St. Ignatius College Preparatory and the University of Santa Clara, and graduated from the University of San Francisco.
 

In a three-season MLB career, Mangan was a .153 hitter (nine-for-59) with five runs and five RBI without home runs in 45 total games. He also had an eight-season (1949–1951; 1954–1955; 1957–1958) career in minor league baseball.

Following his baseball career, Mangan became a high school teacher and small business owner. He died in San Jose, California, at the age of 77.

Sources
Baseball Reference
Retrosheet
San Francisco Chronicle

1929 births
2007 deaths
Albany Senators players
Baseball players from San Francisco
El Paso Texans players
Fort Worth Cats players
Hollywood Stars players
Indianapolis Indians players
Major League Baseball catchers
New York Giants (NL) players
Pittsburgh Pirates players
Sacramento Solons players
San Antonio Missions players
Santa Clara Broncos baseball players
Toronto Maple Leafs (International League) players
University of San Francisco alumni
Uniontown Coal Barons players
York White Roses players